Dennis Waterman (born 1948 in Myrtle Point, Oregon) is a professional poker player and writer. He has over 30 years of poker experience with reported career winnings of $1,230,316 as of 2015.

Waterman became a chess master by the age of 16. In addition to chess, he has played backgammon competitively.

In 2007, Waterman appeared in the Fox Sports Net poker tournament Poker Dome Challenge. Waterman won his preliminary and semi-final matches, earning a seat at the $1 million final table. He lost in heads-up play when his all in call with 10-7 suited failed to improve against his opponent's pocket nines.

In addition to his success at the tables, Waterman also writes articles for such outlets as Pokernews.com. A Buddhist, Waterman has also written several books on spirituality and teaches meditation. His spiritual side has earned him the nickname "Swami" at the tables.

Waterman lives with his wife Geewon in Sedona, Arizona.

Notes

External links
 Pokerlistings.com profile

Living people
1948 births
American poker players
American Buddhists
American gambling writers
American male non-fiction writers
People from Myrtle Point, Oregon
Writers from Oregon